Actionnaire was a 64-gun ship of the line of the French Navy. Originally built for the French East India Company, she was purchased by the Navy and saw service during the War of American Independence

Career 
Actionnaire was built for the French East India Company at Lorient, and entered service for her first commercial journey in 1767. She did a commercial journey to Puducherry, departing Lorient on 12 March 1768 and returning on 30 October 1769.

After the collapse of the Company, the French Navy purchased in April 1770. She did another commercial journey in 1771, and was later recommissioned as a 68-gun ship of the line.

In 1778, Actionnaire was part of the squadron under Orvilliers, being the lead ship in the Third Division of the White Squadron (centre). Her commanding officer was Captain Proisy.

From 1779, she was under Captain Gilart de Larchantel. In 1780, she was part of Guichen's squadron, and she took part in the Battle of Martinique on 17 April 1780, as well as in the actions of 15 May and 19 May 1780.

Larchantel died at Saint-Domingue on 21 January 1781. On 17 July 1781, command of Actionnaire was given to Marigny.

A 12-ship and 4-frigate British squadron intercepted, and in the subsequent Third Battle of Ushant,  and  captured Pégase and four transports. Actionnaire retreated, but the 80-gun Foudroyant gave chase and caught up with her in the evening. Actionnaire fired a token broadside and struck her colours.

Sources and references 
 Notes

References

 Bibliography
 
 
 

External links
 

Ships of the line of the French Navy
1770 ships